This is a list of Catholic churches in Chile.

Cathedrals
See: List of cathedrals in Chile#Roman Catholic
Cathedral of the Most Holy Conception, Chile
Metropolitan Cathedral of Santiago
Sagrario Cathedral

Basilicas
Basilica de la Merced
Basílica de los Sacramentinos
Basilica of Lourdes, Santiago
Basílica de Nuestra Señora del Perpetuo Socorro

Other churches
Church of San Juan Bautista, Dalcahue
Church of Santa María de Loreto, Achao
Iglesia de la Divina Providencia
Iglesia de la Matriz
Iglesia San Agustín, Chile
Parroquia de Santa Filomena
San Francisco Church, Santiago de Chile
San Francisco Church, Valparaíso
Santo Domingo Church, Santiago de Chile

See also
List of Roman Catholic dioceses in Chile
Roman Catholicism in Chile
Churches of Chiloé

 
Chile, Catholic
Chile
Catholic churches